Gahur Castle is seven kilometers from Eshtehard Road East - Iran and five kilometers south of the village Mokhtarabad Qlman among the mountains, there is a relatively high mountain which is called Mount Gahur. The castle was rebuilt in the time of Sultan Ali Mahjoub but again was destroyed after his death.

References 

Castles in Iran
Castles of the Nizari Ismaili state